Altona Magic Soccer Club (Commonly known as Altona Vardar SC) is a soccer team based in Altona North, a western suburb of Melbourne, Victoria, Australia. The Magic currently compete in the second tier of the Australian soccer league system. Founded in 1968, Altona Magic plays out of Paisley Park Soccer Complex. The club has won the Victorian Premier League on 5 occasions in seasons 1995,1996,1997,2008 and 2009. In 2019, Altona made a return to the National Premier Leagues Victoria, following successive promotions in 2017 via the Victorian State League Division 1 and again in 2018 via National Premier Leagues Victoria 2 (West), both seasons Magic were crowned champions.

History
Altona Magic Soccer Club located in the west of Melbourne has been playing in the state elite competition the Victorian Premier League since 1989. The club has won 5 championships and produced many Australian internationals. The club colours of red and black signify the famous Macedonian Football Club, FK Vardar Skopje. Since the formation of the football club the Macedonian Community and Macedonian media continue to call the club the Vardar Football Club.

In 1967 a group of Macedonian immigrants passionate about football initiated a meeting in Yarraville with the idea of forming a football team and by 1968 the team was registered as the Kingsville Soccer Club. The team played at Wembley Park, Yarraville (1968 to 1974) in the Victorian lower amateur leagues.

In 1975 the Kingsville Soccer Club committee successfully acquired debt riddled German backed club Central Altona, with the successful acquisition the club shifted to Gray Reserve, Williamstown and played in the Victorian Provisional League Division 1 (1975 to 1979).

In 1979 the club's desire to compete in the higher divisions of Victoria arrived with the amalgamation of first division strugglers Keilor City (German backed). The amalgamation brought the club to Division One and with a large membership base the club successfully negotiating with the Altona City Council to tenant the Paisley Park Soccer Complex, a master facility of its time and the current home of the club.

The club renamed itself to Altona Gate Soccer Club in 1980 and for next 8 years competed in the Victorian Division 1 League.  In 1988 the first success was achieved, the club won promotion to the State League (VPL) by finishing League Runners-Up.

By 1996 the club incorporated the name Altona Magic Soccer Club, this was at time when Soccer Australia (now Football Federation Australia) encouraged all clubs to remove all ethnic affiliated names and logo's from all clubs across Australia.

The most successful period in the club's history was in the 1990s, Altona won 3 consecutive VPL championships in 1995, 96 and 97. The club added two more championship trophies in 2008 and 2009, this confirmed the club's position as one of the most successful clubs in Victorian Football.

In 2010, after a horrific season in the Victorian Premier League, Altona Magic were relegated to the Victorian State League Division 1. The 2011 season became the first time since 1988 that Altona was to compete below the top tier of football in Victoria.

Magic spent seasons 2011–2013 in the Victorian State League Division 1 finishing mid-table each time, which was the second tier at the time. In 2014, following the introduction of the National Premier Leagues Victoria, which Vardar was not accepted in to, the club then competed in the regionalised Victorian State League Division 1 North-West, the new third tier of football in Victoria. In 2014 and 2015, the club again finished mid-table on both occasions.

Led by the likes of Jon Mcshane, Adamson Ajayi and Jason Hayne, Altona Magic took out the State League 1 North-West title in 2016, topping the table all year long. Magic then took out the overall State League 1 championship, defeating State League 1 South-East title holders Mornington SC.

After the 2016 title-winning season, Altona Magic confirmed its ambition to join the National Premier Leagues Victoria. It appointed Goran Lozanovski as senior head coach, replacing the incumbent Vlado Tortevski, and signed the likes of Amadu Koroma from South Melbourne, Joey Franjić from Hume City, Greg Lombardo from Northcote City and Michael Stark from Port Melbourne. The club was successful in going back-to-back in 2017, winning the State League 1 title and gaining promotion into the NPL 2, the state's second tier domestic league.

In the off-season, Magic signed Bentleigh Greens championship winning duo Troy Ruthven and Ben Litfin, Green Gully's Rani Dowisha, Pascoe Vale's Mark Pistininzi and Heidelberg United's Jordan Wilkes. The signings, all of whom played in Victoria's top tier the season prior, signalled Magic's intent for the 2018 season. On 11 August 2018, in the club's 50th year of existence, Altona won the NPL2 West championship with three games to spare, following a 2–0 win over Brunswick City SC. Magic led the competition for the large majority of the season and finished 11 points clear at the top of the table.

In 2019, after a positive start to the season, long-term injuries to Michiel Hemmen, Jon McShane and Ross Archibald stretched the squad and ultimately fell away from finals contention, picking up just 1 point in its last 7 games and finished in 11th position in its first season back in the Victorian top flight.

In 2020,due to the COVID-19 situation, Football Victoria decided to cancel the 2020 season and leaving Altona Magic in dead last, 14th after just 5 games played. It was decided by the board of Football Victoria, that there will be no relegation or champion crowned for the 2020 season.

Senior Head Coach Goran Lozanovski, who was appointed in 2016 and lead Altona Magic to two Championships in 2017 and 2018 in his four-year stint at the helm, also parted ways shortly after the cancellation of the 2020 season. On 26 September 2020,it was announced John Markovski, would be named his successor for the 2021 season.

In the 2021 season, following a poor run or results, Savvas Patikkis was named as the clubs Senior Head Coach for the remainder of the season and then confirmed for the 2022 season.

Current squad

Current Women's Squad

Honours
Victorian Premier League Champions 1995, 1996, 1997, 2008, 2009
Victorian Premier League Runners Up 2004, 2006
Victorian Premier League Finalists 1994, 1998, 2003, 2005
National Premier Leagues Victoria 2 West Champions 2018
Victorian State League Division 1 Champions 2016, 2017
Victorian State League Division 1 Runners Up 1988
Dockerty Cup Runners Up 1989

Notable former coaches

Individual honours
VPL Player of the Year
1997 – George Jolevski
2001 – Zoran Todorovski
2004 – Doug Mladenovic
2006 – Sash Becvinovski

Bill Fleming Medal
1997 – George Jolevski

VPL Coach of the Year
1995 – Ian Dobson
1996 – Gary Cole

VPL Top Goalscorer Award
1998 – Sash Becvinovski
2006 – Sash Becvinovski

VPL Goalkeeper of the Year
1997 – Darren McGrath

Jimmy Rooney Medal
1995 – Chris Emsovski
1996 – Darren McGrath
1997 – Savva Rusmir
2004 – Levent Osman
2009 – Kliment Taseski

References

External links
Altona Magic (Official Website)
Football Victoria (Official Website)

Altona Magic SC
Association football clubs established in 1968
Association football clubs established in 1975
Soccer clubs in Melbourne
Victorian Premier League teams
National Premier Leagues clubs
Macedonian sports clubs in Australia
Sport in the City of Hobsons Bay